Jishan may refer to the following:

 Jishan County, Yancheng, Shanxi
 Jishan railway station, Tianhe District, Guangzhou, Guangdong
 Jishan, Anhui, town in and subdivision of Nanling County, Anhui
 Jishan, Hubei, town in and subdivision of Shayang County, Hubei
 Jishan, Shandong, town in and subdivision of Juancheng County, Shandong
 Jishan Gatehouse, historical site in Taichung, Taiwan
 Mount Ji, a mountain near Bozhou in Anhui